Varnol Mal (or Varnolmal) was a former non-salute princely state in Gujarat, western India.

History
The minor princely state, belonging to the Pandu Mehwas division of Rewa Kantha. 

In 1901 it comprised also a second village, covering 3 1/2 square miles, with a combined population of 426, yielding 1,094 Rupees state revenue (1903-4, nearly all from land), paying 65 Rupees tribute, to the Gaekwar Baroda State.

See also 
 Varnoli Moti, neighboring princely state
 Varnoli Nani, neighboring princely state

References 

Princely states of Gujarat